Notre-Dame-de-Grâce is a provincial electoral district in the Montreal region of Quebec, Canada, that elects members to the National Assembly of Quebec.  It comprises the city of Montreal West and part of the Côte-des-Neiges–Notre-Dame-de-Grâce borough of the city of Montreal.

It was created for the 1966 election from part of the Montréal–Notre-Dame-de-Grâce electoral district.

In the change from the 2001 to the 2011 electoral map, it lost some territory to the Saint-Henri–Sainte-Anne electoral district. In the change from the 2011 to the 2017 electoral map, the riding gains the remainder of the Notre-Dame-de-Grâce neighbourhood from D'Arcy-McGee.

Linguistic demographics
Anglophone:  41.9%
Allophone: 31.1%
Francophone: 27.0%

Members of the Legislative Assembly / National Assembly

Election results

* Result compared to Action démocratique

|-

|Socialist Democracy
|Marie Bertrand
|align="right"|256  	
|align="right"|0.88
|align="right"|-0.49
|-

|Natural Law
|Elizabeth Gibson
|align="right"|140 	
|align="right"|0.48
|align="right"|+0.10
|-

|-

|}

|-
 
|No designation
|Gordon Atkinson
|align="right"|1,628
|align="right"|5.48
|align="right"|-37.55

|-

|New Democrat
|Marie Bertrand
|align="right"|406 	
|align="right"|1.37
|align="right"|-0.06
|-

|-

|CANADA!
|Serge Baruchel
|align="right"|182
|align="right"|0.61
|align="right"|–
|-
 
|No designation
|Al Rhino Feldman
|align="right"|124
|align="right"|0.42
|align="right"|–
|-

|Natural Law
|Frederic Klein
|align="right"|112	
|align="right"|0.38
|align="right"|–
|}

|-

|New Democrat
|Hélène Guay
|align="right"|3,548	
|align="right"|25.53
|align="right"|+16.89

|-
 
|Independent
|Jay Laurence Taylor
|align="right"|335	
|align="right"|2.41
|align="right"|–
|-

|-

|Humanist
|Richard Banville
|align="right"|86	
|align="right"|0.62
|align="right"|+0.02
|-

|Parti indépendantiste
|Stéphane Duchesne
|align="right"|86	
|align="right"|0.62
|align="right"|–
|-

|Workers
|Serge Turmel
|align="right"|49
|align="right"|0.35
|align="right"|–
|}

|-

|New Democrat
|Michel Agnaieff
|align="right"|2,333	
|align="right"|8.64
|align="right"|–
|-

|Humanist
|Gertrude Retieff-Caisse
|align="right"|162	
|align="right"|0.60
|align="right"|–

|Christian Socialist
|Michel Lacroix
|align="right"|82	
|align="right"|0.30
|align="right"|–
|}

|-

|Freedom of Choice
|Roopnarine Singh
|align="right"|501
|align="right"|1.65
|align="right"|-22.58
|-

|}

|-
 
|Freedom of Choice
|David De Jong
|align="right"|4,983
|align="right"|24.23
|align="right"|–

|-

|-

|Workers
|Gérard Lachance
|align="right"|100	
|align="right"|0.49
|align="right"|–
|}

|-

|-

|Democratic Alliance
|Robert Keaton
|align="right"|3,497 	
|align="right"|11.66
|align="right"|–
|-

|-

|-
 
|Independent
|John J. Raudsepp
|align="right"|117	
|align="right"|0.39
|align="right"|–
|-

|NDP – RMS coalition
|Cyril Durocher
|align="right"|103	
|align="right"|0.34
|align="right"|–
|}

|-

|Parti créditiste
|Mary-Elizabeth Hall Taylor
|align="right"|1,156	
|align="right"|4.06
|align="right"|+3.08
|-

|-
|}

|-

|New Democrat
|Donald Robson Peacock
|align="right"|843	
|align="right"|2.30
|align="right"|–
|-

|-

|-
|}

|-

|-
|}

|-
 
|Independent
|Luke Gerald Dougherty
|align="right"|2,941
|align="right"|11.49
|align="right"|+7.15
|-

|-

|RIN
|Walter Patrice O'Leary
|align="right"|949	
|align="right"|3.71
|align="right"|–
|-

|Ralliement national
|Marcien St-Aubin
|align="right"|77	
|align="right"|0.30
|align="right"|–
|-
|}

References

External links
Information
 Elections Quebec

Election results
 Election results (National Assembly)
 Election results (QuébecPolitique)

Maps
 2011 map (PDF)
 2001 map (Flash)
2001–2011 changes (Flash)
1992–2001 changes (Flash)
 Electoral map of Montreal region
 Quebec electoral map, 2011

Montreal West, Quebec
Provincial electoral districts of Montreal
Quebec provincial electoral districts
Côte-des-Neiges–Notre-Dame-de-Grâce